East Rockhill Township is a township in Bucks County, Pennsylvania, United States. The original Rockhill Township was established in 1740 and was divided into East and West Rockhill Townships in 1890.  The population was 5,706 at the 2010 Census. East Rockhill is part of Pennridge School District. Pennridge Airport is located in East Rockhill Township.

History
The Levi Sheard Mill and Sheard's Mill Covered Bridge are listed on the National Register of Historic Places.   It was also the location of the formerly listed Mood's Covered Bridge.

Geography
Tohickon Creek flows along the northern edge of the township into Lake Nockamixon at its northeastern edge and eastward into the Delaware River and drains most of East Rockhill. The southeastern side of the township is drained by the East Branch Perkiomen Creek into the Perkiomen Creek and Schuylkill River.

East Rockhill's villages include Hagersville, Rich Hill, Rockhill, Rockhill Station, Rock Ridge, Smoketown (also in West Rockhill), Sterners Mill, Weisel, and White Horse.

Natural features include the East Branch Perkiomen Creek, Rock Hill, Three Mile Run, and Tohickon Creek.

Adjacent municipalities
 West Rockhill Township (west)
 Richland Township (northwest)
 Haycock Township (north)
 Bedminster Township (east)
 Hilltown Township (southeast)
 Perkasie (south)

Demographics

As of the 2010 census, the township was 95.8% White, 0.7% Black or African American, 0.2% Native American, 0.6% Asian, and 1.2% were two or more races. 1.6% of the population were of Hispanic or Latino ancestry.

As of the census of 2000, there were 5,199 people, 1,828 households, and 1,427 families residing in the township.  The population density was 401.5 people per square mile (155.0/km2).  There were 1,883 housing units at an average density of 145.4/sq mi (56.1/km2).  The racial makeup of the township was 97.19% White, 0.81% African American, 0.40% Native American, 0.38% Asian, 0.06% Pacific Islander, 0.19% from other races, and 0.96% from two or more races. Hispanic or Latino of any race were 1.25% of the population.

There were 1,828 households, out of which 40.4% had children under the age of 18 living with them, 68.6% were married couples living together, 5.8% had a female householder with no husband present, and 21.9% were non-families. 17.1% of all households were made up of individuals, and 5.4% had someone living alone who was 65 years of age or older.  The average household size was 2.82 and the average family size was 3.21.

In the township the population was spread out, with 28.8% under the age of 18, 6.3% from 18 to 24, 32.5% from 25 to 44, 23.6% from 45 to 64, and 8.9% who were 65 years of age or older.  The median age was 36 years. For every 100 females there were 102.1 males.  For every 100 females age 18 and over, there were 101.0 males.

The median income for a household in the township was $59,663, and the median income for a family was $70,645. Males had a median income of $43,134 versus $30,473 for females. The per capita income for the township was $24,594.  About 2.0% of families and 4.9% of the population were below the poverty line, including 3.0% of those under age 18 and 7.6% of those age 65 or over.

Transportation

The main highways serving East Rockhill Township are Pennsylvania Route 313 and Pennsylvania Route 563. PA 313 follows a southeast-northwest alignment following Dublin Pike across northeastern portions of the township. PA 563 follows a north-south alignment utilizing Ridge Road, Dublin Pike and Mountain View Drive across the eastern portion of the township. The two highways have a concurrency along a portion of Dublin Pike.

Climate

According to the Köppen climate classification system, East Rockhill Twp has a Hot-summer, Humid continental climate (Dfa). Dfa climates are characterized by at least one month having an average mean temperature ≤ , at least four months with an average mean temperature ≥ , at least one month with an average mean temperature ≥  and no significant precipitation difference between seasons. Although most summer days are slightly humid in East Rockhill Twp, episodes of heat and high humidity can occur with heat index values > . The average wettest month is July, which corresponds with the annual peak in thunderstorm activity. Episodes of extreme cold and wind can occur with wind chill values < . Ice storms and large snowstorms depositing ≥  of snow occur once every few years, particularly during nor’easters from December through February.

Ecology

According to the A. W. Kuchler U.S. potential natural vegetation types, East Rockhill Twp would have a dominant vegetation type of Appalachian Oak (104) with a dominant vegetation form of Eastern Hardwood Forest (25). The spring bloom typically begins by April 14 and fall color usually peaks by October 26.

See also
 Pennridge Regional Police
 http://www.livingplaces.com/PA/Bucks_County/East_Rockhill_Township/Rockhill_Station.html

References

External links

 Township website

Townships in Bucks County, Pennsylvania